Don L. McCorkell, Jr is an American politician and filmmaker who served as a member of the Oklahoma House of Representatives representing the 72nd district between 1979 and 1996.

He ran unsuccessful Democratic primary campaigns in the 1996 United States Senate election in Oklahoma and 2006 Tulsa mayoral election.

Career

Politics
Don McCorkell represented the 72nd district of the Oklahoma House of Representatives between 1978 and 1996.

In 1996, McCorkell retired to run in the Democratic primary for one of Oklahoma's United States Senate seats. His campaign's top priorities were economic development and education.

In 2006, McCorkell lost the Tulsa mayoral Democratic primary to Kathy Taylor. He spent $1 million self financing his campaign. During the primary he accused Taylor of voter fraud in the 2000 election, however the district attorneys' office did not file charges.

Film
After the 2006 mayoral election, McCorkell travelled to Santa Barbara to visit and eventually moved to the area. There he began making environmental documentaries. His 2008 documentary, Shall We Gather at the River, was critically acclaimed  throughout the western United States.

Filmography

References

20th-century American politicians
21st-century American politicians
American filmmakers
Living people
20th-century Members of the Oklahoma House of Representatives
Democratic Party members of the Oklahoma House of Representatives
Year of birth missing (living people)
Politicians from Baltimore